Cristian Daniel Oroș (born 15 October 1984) is a Romanian footballer who plays as centre back for Lotus Băile Felix.

Club career

On 26 July 2008 Oroș scored in his first game in Liga I against Unirea Urziceni, while playing for FC Brașov.

Honours
FC Brașov
 Liga II (1): 2007–08
Astra Giurgiu
 Liga I (1): 2015–16
 Supercupa României (1): 2016

References

External links
 
 
 

1984 births
Living people
People from Sighetu Marmației
Romanian footballers
Association football defenders
Romania international footballers
Liga I players
FC Brașov (1936) players
FC Rapid București players
FC Astra Giurgiu players
Sepsi OSK Sfântu Gheorghe players
Liga II players
FC Olimpia Satu Mare players
FC Bihor Oradea players
CS Luceafărul Oradea players
ACS Viitorul Târgu Jiu players
Liga III players
Ukrainian Premier League players
FC Hoverla Uzhhorod players
Romanian expatriate footballers
Expatriate footballers in Ukraine
Romanian expatriate sportspeople in Ukraine